Daniel Hunter (born 28 June 1994) is a New Zealand swimmer. He specialises in the 100 m freestyle and 50 m freestyle events

Hunter swims for the Howick Pakuranga Swimming Club in Auckland. In 2016, he set New Zealand records for both 50m freestyle and 100m freestyle in both short course and long course.

Hunter competed in the 50m freestyle and 100m freestyle of the 2016 world short course championships in Windsor, Ontario, making the semi-finals in the 50m event.

References

External links
 
 

1994 births
Living people
New Zealand male freestyle swimmers
Swimmers at the 2018 Commonwealth Games
Commonwealth Games competitors for New Zealand
21st-century New Zealand people